Hsieh Yu-hsing  (born July 23, 1983) is a men's singles and mixed doubles international badminton player from Chinese Taipei (Taiwan). Hsieh started to play badminton international championships since 2002. At the moment, Hsieh had become the men's singles No.1 international player in Taiwan, but he always being drawn to face more stronger players in the overseas countries tournament. In 2008, 2009, and 2010, he always knocked out in the second round and sometimes in the last eight in most tournament he attended. He was even knocked out in the first round because of facing more stronger overseas players. Hsieh had become world ranking No.33 in the men's singles international player now so that he is always met more stronger players in the second round and sometimes in the first round.

Career

2010
In 2010, Hsieh is very weak in many tournaments. He always lost in the first round to many country's youngster except the Macau Open Grand Prix Gold. In Macau Open, same like last year, he was again clashed into the last eight. He was stopped by Lee Hyun-il from Korea in Macau who is successfully clashed into the semifinal match in the 2008 Olympics games. Later in November, Hsieh represents Taiwan to play the 2010 Asian Games in Guangzhou. In the men's team competition round of 16, he had helped Chinese Taipei to get the first point 1-0 by winning India's youngster Arvind Bhat with rubber games 28-26 15-21 21-13 and later Chinese Taipei team got 3-1 win in the round of 16 and had clashed into the last eight competition against Indonesian team. Hsieh lost 21-11 8-21 12-21 to Indonesian ace Taufik Hidayat in the first match. So he had thrown away one point. After his match, the other Chinese Taipei players also have no ability to win their match. Thus, Chinese Taipei men's badminton team had been knocked out in the last eight in their team competition. Later in the individual men's singles competition, Hsieh met the Indonesia's No.1 men's singles player Taufik Hidayat again and lost 16-21 12-21 two straight games in the first round. In December, Hsieh attended the second China Open Super Series in Shanghai. He had improved a little bit in this tournament. He beat Christian Lind Thomsen from Denmark with a good result 18-21 21-3 21-16. However, he was again stopped by China's Chen Jin 8-21 21-18 16-21 and had no chance to play in the last eight although he was improved.

2009
Hsieh attended Badminton Proton Malaysia Open which is held in the capital of Malaysia, Kuala Lumpur, in January. He played both events in the tournament, men's singles and mixed doubles. He knocked out in the first round in the mixed doubles while in the men's singles, he had clashed into men's singles semifinals successfully. But he was knocked out 13–21 14–21 by South Korean Park Sung-hwan. In March, Hsieh attended Badminton All England Open. In this tournament, Hsieh lost to Indonesia's strongest players in the first round in both events he took. Later, he continued his competition in Wilson Swiss Open. He took both events also, he played until second round in mixed doubles and in the men's singles he was successfully played until the quarters final match. He beat India's Chetan Anand in the second round by winning rubber games 9-21 22-20 21-17. He was then stopped by China's Lin Dan 16-21 14-21 in the quarters final and ended his tournament. In early April, he went to Osaka and took part in both events to get some points to improve his world ranking. In June, Hsieh took part men's singles match only in the Singapore Open. He lost to Indonesia's Sony Dwi Kuncoro 15-21 15-21 in the second round. Then, he attended Indonesian Open also in men's singles only. Later, he was blew away again in the second round by China's Lin Dan with 12-21 12-21. In August, Hsieh grabbed his golden opportunity to take part in the Macau Open Grand Prix Gold competition. Hsieh clashed into the last eight in Macau. But unfornately again, he was stopped by Indonesian Taufik Hidayat 16-21 14-21 in the last eight. Later in the Chinese Taipei Open and Li Ning China Open, Hsieh again lost 17-21 21-17 20-22 to Thailand's Tanongsak Saensomboonsuk and lost 15-21 19-21 to China's Lin Dan in the second round. Then in Japan Open, he lost to Indonesian Simon Santoso 18-21 6-21 in the first round. In November, Hsieh again took both events in the Hong Kong Open Super Series. He lost to Malaysian mixed doubles pairs in the qualification match and later he lost 13-21 9-21 to Indonesian Dionysius Hayom Rumbaka in the second round. Hsieh maybe made many mistakes again the Indonesian. After that, Hsieh went for the second time of China Open to play in only men's singles. He was beaten by Chen Jin of China in the second round by 14-21 5-21. In December, he attended BWF World Super Series Masters Competition in Johor Bahru, Malaysia. All of the players who come to this Masters Competition should win at least 2 points in the opening three rounds before clashing into the semi-finals. Hsieh had won 1 point only in his match so that he was again have nobond to play in the last four. He was only beaten by former Olympic Champion Taufik Hidayat of Indonesia with a 21-17 21-15 win in the last round. The first round he lost 11-21 12-21 to the world number one Lee Chong Wei and in the second round he lost to Chinese ace Bao Chunlai 21-17 8-21 16-21.

2008
He was a surprise in the Beijing 2008 men's singles tournament. He beat Kaveh Mehrabi from Iran 21-16 21-12 in the first round, Nguyen Tien Minh from Vietnam 21-16 15-21 21-15 in the second round and defeating Wong Choong Hann from Malaysia 14-21 21-17 21-18 in the third round, who has beaten Indonesian legend Taufik Hidayat with a 21-19 21-16 win in the opening round. Hsieh was stopped by Chen Jin of China 8-21 14-21 in the quarter-finals. After playing the Olympic games, he took part in the Chinese Taipei Open. In Chinese Taipei Open, he was again played back both events. He was eliminated in the third round in both events that he took and he had ended the tournament. After a few days, he continued his match in the Japan Open Super Series. He took part in three events in Japan Open, men's singles, men's doubles and mixed doubles.

Achievements

Summer Universiade 
Men's doubles

BWF Grand Prix 
The BWF Grand Prix has two level such as Grand Prix and Grand Prix Gold. It is a series of badminton tournaments, sanctioned by Badminton World Federation (BWF) since 2007.

Men's singles

Mixed doubles

 BWF Grand Prix Gold tournament
 BWF Grand Prix tournament

BWF International Challenge/Series
Men's singles

Mixed doubles

 BWF International Challenge tournament
 BWF International Series tournament

References

External links
 
 
 
 

Taiwanese male badminton players
1983 births
Living people
Badminton players at the 2008 Summer Olympics
Olympic badminton players of Taiwan
Sportspeople from Kaohsiung
Badminton players at the 2010 Asian Games
Universiade medalists in badminton
Universiade silver medalists for Chinese Taipei
Universiade bronze medalists for Chinese Taipei
Asian Games competitors for Chinese Taipei
Medalists at the 2007 Summer Universiade